Millicent Carey McIntosh (November 30, 1898 – January 3, 2001) was an educational administrator and American feminist who led the Brearley School (1930–1947), and most prominently Barnard College (1947–1962).   The first married woman to head one of the Seven Sisters, she was "considered a national role model for generations of young women who wanted to combine career and family," advocating for working mothers and for child care as a dignified profession.

Early life
McIntosh was born in Baltimore, Maryland on November 30, 1898 to Anthony Morris Carey and Margaret Cheston Thomas, both active Quakers. She was also a Quaker. Her mother was a member of Bryn Mawr College's first graduating class (1889). Her aunt, M. Carey Thomas, also a leader in women's education, founded the Bryn Mawr School in Baltimore.

McIntosh attended Bryn Mawr College for her undergraduate, majoring in Greek and English and graduating in 1920 magna cum laude. McIntosh studied economics at Cambridge University, and earned an English Ph.D. from Johns Hopkins University with a dissertation on 14th century mystery plays. After graduating with her Ph.D. in 1926, McIntosh became an assistant professor of English at Bryn Mawr College. Shortly afterward, we was appointed dean of freshman and then acting dean of the college. Later, she headed the Brearley School for seventeen years, where she pioneered a sex education class for sixth grade students.

Her husband was the pediatrician Rustin McIntosh, with whom she had five children.

Barnard career
McIntosh became Dean of Barnard College in 1947, and became the institution's first President in 1952. She was elected a Fellow of the American Academy of Arts and Sciences in 1966. She retired in 1962 and was replaced by Rosemary Park.

After Barnard, she helped to found Kirkland College in the 1960s.

References

1898 births
2001 deaths
American centenarians
American feminists
Presidents of Barnard College
Barnard College faculty
Bryn Mawr College faculty
Bryn Mawr College alumni
Fellows of the American Academy of Arts and Sciences
Johns Hopkins University alumni
People from Baltimore
Bryn Mawr School people
Women centenarians
American Quakers
Quaker feminists